Bobbi Salvör Menuez (born 1993) is an American actor and model. They are the founder of the Luck You artist collective in New York City.  Menuez appeared in such films as Something in the Air, The Breakup Girl and White Girl and is a co-star in the Amazon Video series I Love Dick.  They have been a curator at MoMA PS1.

Personal life
Menuez was born in Park Slope, New York City in 1993. Formerly known as India Menuez, they announced their current name on social media in January 2019. Menuez identifies as trans and non-binary, and uses they/them pronouns.

Filmography

Film

Television

References

External links

Actresses from New York City
American film actors
American television actors
American non-binary actors
1993 births
Living people
Non-binary models
21st-century LGBT people
Transgender non-binary people